The 1984 VMI Keydets football team was an American football team that represented the Virginia Military Institute (VMI) as a member of the Southern Conference (SoCon) during the 1984 NCAA Division I-AA football season. In their 14th year under head coach Bob Thalman, the team compiled an overall record of 1–9 with a mark of 1–3 in conference play, placing sixth in the SoCon. Thalman was fired at the conclusion of the season, and compiled an all time record of 54–94–3 during his tenure of head coach of the Keydets from 1971 through 1984.

Schedule

References

VMI
VMI Keydets football seasons
VMI Keydets football